Burmese amber is fossil resin dating to the early Late Cretaceous Cenomanian age recovered from deposits in the Hukawng Valley of northern Myanmar. It is known for being one of the most diverse Cretaceous age amber paleobiotas, containing rich arthropod fossils, along with uncommon vertebrate fossils and even rare marine inclusions. A mostly complete list of all taxa described up until 2018 can be found in Ross 2018; its supplement Ross 2019b covers most of 2019.

Amoebozoa

Dictyostelia

Myxogastria

Incertae sedis

Apicomplexa

Aconoidasida

Haemosporida

Conoidasida

Eugregarinorida

Euglenozoa

Kinetoplastea

Trypanosomatida

Metamonada

Anaeromonadea

Oxymonadida

Trichonymphea

Trichonymphida

Trichomonadea

Cristamonadida

Spirotrichonymphida

Trichomonadida

"Opisthokonta"

Mesomycetozoea

Eccrinales

Proteobacteria

Alphaproteobacteria

Rickettsiales

Plants

Chlorophyte green algaes

Chaetophorales

Chlamydomonadales

Bryophyte true mosses

Dicranales

Hypnodendrales

Lycopods and spike mosses

Marchantiophyte liverworts

Porellales

Polypodiopsid ferns

Cyatheales

Polypodiales

Angiosperm flowering plants

Cornales

Laurales

Liliales

Nymphaeales

Oxalidales

Poales

Rosales

Incertae sedis

Fungi

Ascomycota

Hypocreales

Ophiostomatales

Basidiomycota

Agaricales

Boletales

incertae sedis

"Zygomycetes"

Priscadvenales

Echinodermata

Crinoidea

Isocrinida

Arthropoda

Arachnida

Amblypygi

Araneae

Ixodida

Opilioacariformes

Opiliones

Palpigradi

Pseudoscorpiones

Ricinulei

Schizomida

Scorpiones

Solifugae

Uropygi (Thelyphonida)

Trombidiformes

Incertae sedis

Diplopoda

Callipodida

Platydesmida

Polyxenida

Siphoniulida

Siphonophorida

Spirostreptida

"Entognatha"

Entomobryomorpha

Poduromorpha

Symphypleona

Insecta

Malacostraca

Decapoda

Isopoda

Ostracoda

Symphyla

Scolopendrellidae

Mollusca

Cephalopoda

Ammonitida

Gastropoda

"Architaenioglossa"

Heterobranchia

Littorinimorpha

Neritimorpha

Bivalvia

Nematoda

Chromadorea

Rhabditida

Enoplea

Mermithida

Secernentea

Aphelenchida

Oxyurida

Nematomorpha

Gordioidea

Onychophora

Udeonychophora

Euonychophora

Vertebrata

Amphibia

Allocaudata

Anura

Reptilia

Archosauria

Squamata

Ichnotaxa

Insecta

Dictyoptera

Mollusca

Bivalvia

References

 
Prehistoric fauna by locality